Undiscovered is a 2005 American drama film directed by Meiert Avis. The plot is about a group of aspiring entertainers who intend to establish their careers in Los Angeles. Released on August 26, 2005, the film received a largely negative reception, holding an 8% approval rating on Rotten Tomatoes, based on 73 reviews. The film also had the record for largest percentage drop-off in ticket sales from its opening weekend to its second weekend in theatrical release, 86.4%, until it was broken by Collide in March 2017.

The film was originally called Wannabe, but was retitled prior to release. Undiscovered was the first significant film role for Ashlee Simpson, who had previously acted on the television series 7th Heaven before launching a singing career. "Undiscovered" is also the name of one of Simpson's songs, the closing track from her debut album Autobiography, the song is included in the film.

The DVD and VHS of the film was released on December 26, 2005.

Plot

Aspiring New York model Brier falls in love at first sight with a struggling musician, Luke, when they cross paths on a subway train. Having achieved success as a model, she decides to move to L.A. to launch an acting career. She wanted to become a dancer but it did not work out. With the support of her agent and sometimes surrogate mom, Carrie, she lands a spot in an acting class where she befriends another would-be actress, Clea. While out on the town, Brier crosses paths with Luke once again in a club called 'The Mint'. The two girls realize that he is actually a good musician, and they then decide to help him and set out to create some L.A. style hype to get him noticed by a record company. As his profile rises, so do the demands of his budding new career, and they both discover that the price of fame may be higher than anyone expected.

Main cast

Awards and nominations 
One nomination at the 2005 Golden Raspberry Awards:
 Worst Supporting Actress (Ashlee Simpson)

See also

, for other films with similar second weekend drops

References

External links

2005 films
2005 drama films
American drama films
Films directed by Meiert Avis
Films about music and musicians
Films set in Los Angeles
Lakeshore Entertainment films
Lionsgate films
Films produced by Tom Rosenberg
Films produced by Gary Lucchesi
2000s English-language films
2000s American films